Live '84 is an album released by Black Flag in 1984 on SST Records. It is a live recording of a show played in 1984 and features mostly tracks from My War and Slip It In.  A video was shot simultaneously and was briefly available through SST; the now-out-of-print video has been widely bootlegged.

The album was originally issued as a cassette-only release, almost simultaneously with Slip It In. In 1998, Greg Ginn remixed the album for CD reissue.

Recording
The album was recorded at the Stone nightclub in San Francisco, CA.

Critical reception
Maximum Rocknroll called the album "a superior quality live tape showcasing an evening with a seminal, legendary, masochistic, poignant, chaotic beast of an outfit who have not lost one iota of aggro." Trouser Press wrote that "Black Flag concerts were typically an utter mess, which suits the songs perfectly, making this chaotic explosion naturally one of their best releases." The Spin Alternative Record Guide deemed it "tolerable until the lounge-core latter half of side two."

Track listing
"The Process of Weeding Out" (Ginn) – 8:31
"Nervous Breakdown" (Ginn) – 2:06
"Can't Decide" (Ginn) – 5:01
"Slip It In" (Ginn) – 5:54
"My Ghetto" (Ginn/Rollins) – 1:14
"Black Coffee" (Ginn) – 4:53
"I Won't Stick Any of You Unless and Until I Can Stick All of You!" (Ginn) – 4:53
"Forever Time" (Ginn/Rollins) – 2:20
"Fix Me" (Ginn) – 0:53
"Six Pack" (Ginn) – 2:26
"My War" (Dukowski) – 3:34
"Jealous Again" (Ginn) – 1:59
"I Love You" (Dukowski) – 3:19
"Swinging Man" (Ginn/Rollins) – 3:10
"Three Nights" (Ginn/Rollins) – 6:10
"Nothing Left Inside" (Ginn/Rollins) – 6:25
"Wound Up" (Ginn/Rollins) – 4:00
"Rat's Eyes" (Ginn/Rollins) – 4:21
"The Bars" (Dukowski/Rollins) – 4:38

Personnel
Henry Rollins – vocals
Greg Ginn – guitar
Kira Roessler – bass
Bill Stevenson – drums
Tom Troccoli – backing vocals

References

Black Flag (band) live albums
1984 live albums
SST Records live albums